Joshua Kirkpatrick (born 13 June 1987) is a Canadian bobsledder. He competed in the four-man event at the 2018 Winter Olympics.

References

1987 births
Living people
Canadian male pole vaulters
Canadian male bobsledders
Olympic bobsledders of Canada
Bobsledders at the 2018 Winter Olympics
Place of birth missing (living people)